The 2019 Thailand Women's T20 Smash was a women's T20I cricket tournament held in Bangkok, Thailand from 12 to 19 January 2019. The participants were the women's national sides of Thailand, Bhutan, China, Hong Kong, Indonesia, Malaysia, Myanmar, Nepal and United Arab Emirates, as well as a Thailand 'A' side. Matches (except those involving Thailand 'A') were recognised as official WT20I games as per ICC's announcement that full WT20I status would apply to all the matches played between women's teams of associate members after 1 July 2018. The matches were played at the Asian Institute of Technology Ground and the Terdthai Cricket Ground, both in Bangkok. Thailand won the tournament after winning all of their matches.

On 13 January, while chasing a first innings score of 203/3, China Women were bowled out by United Arab Emirates Women for just 14 runs. This was the lowest ever total in a WT20I and the biggest margin of defeat, until Mali recorded four lower totals in June 2019 during the 2019 Kwibuka Women's T20 Tournament.

Group A

Points table

Matches

Group B

Points table

Matches

Play-offs

Semi-final 1

Consolation semi-final 1

Semi-final 2

Consolation semi-final 2

Fifth-place match

Third-place match

Seventh-place match

Final

Final standings

References

External links
 Series home at ESPNcricinfo

Cricket in Thailand
2019 in women's cricket